Monte São João is a low mountain in the central part of the island of São Vicente, Cape Verde. Its elevation is 154 m. It is situated 3 km southwest of the city centre of Mindelo.

See also
List of mountains in Cape Verde

References

External links
Monte São João on mindelo.info 

Sao Joao
Geography of São Vicente, Cape Verde